Michael M. Mullen (August 21, 1918 – February 19, 1978) is a former Democratic member of the Pennsylvania House of Representatives.

References

Democratic Party members of the Pennsylvania House of Representatives
1978 deaths
1918 births
20th-century American politicians